Maaria Eira (real name Saskia D’Onofrio,  Suomalainen; 23 October 1924 – 19 June 1999) was a Finnish operatic soprano and film actress noted for her coloratura voice and stage presence.

Personal life
Saskia Suomalainen was born to an artistic family: her father was the violinist and music critic Yrjö Suomalainen, and her mother the professional dancer Estelle Suomalainen. Her maternal grandfather was the sculptor Emil Wikström. Her older brother was Professori Kari Suomalainen, who became famous as a political caricaturist and cartoonist.

In the early 1950s, she married the Italian doctor Giovanni D'Onofrio, taking his name and settling in his home city of Rome.

Education
She received her initial training at the Ballet of Finland (now the Finnish National Ballet) ballet school at an early age, from 1928 to 1936, with the aim of becoming a dancer like her mother.

Early on, however, she switched to singing, first training in Finland under , furthering her studies from 1948 until 1950 at the Royal Swedish Opera in Stockholm, and from 1950 continuing under the tutelage of the renowned Italian soprano Toti Dal Monte.

Career

Singing
Eira's debut performance as a singer came in 1942, at the young age of 18, as Gilda in Verdi's Rigoletto.

In 1951, she won the Rome international singing contest, which paved the way for her international career.

Her repertoire comprised leading roles of the 19th-century opera, including Violetta in La traviata, Desdemona in Otello, Margareta in Faust and Leonora in Il trovatore.

Film
Attracting the attention of the Finnish film industry, Eira was cast in Toivo Särkkä's 1944 film Balladi. She later starred in another three musical films, Hannu Leminen's Kesäillan valssi (1951), Jack Witikka's Mä oksalla ylimmällä (1954) and Leminen's Onnelliset (1954).

Directing
In 1980, Maaria Eira D'Onofrio began her career as opera director, debuting at the Rome Opera with a production of Strauss' Elektra. She later went on to direct Aida at Macerata (1982) and Lucia di Lammermoor in Bari (1985), followed among others by productions of La bohème and Madama Butterfly. She won the La Triade artistic award for her directorial accomplishments in 1986.

References

External links

1924 births
1999 deaths
Finnish operatic sopranos
Opera directors
Finnish film actresses
Singers from Helsinki
Actresses from Helsinki
Finnish expatriates in Italy